A cricket team representing England toured Australia in the 1932–33 season. The tour was organised by the Marylebone Cricket Club and matches outside the Tests were played under the MCC name. The tour included five Test matches in Australia, and England won The Ashes by four games to one. The tour was highly controversial because of the bodyline bowling tactics used by the England team under the captaincy of Douglas Jardine. After the Australian tour was over, the MCC team moved on to play in New Zealand, where two further Test matches were played.

The MCC team

The MCC team was captained by Douglas Jardine, with Bob Wyatt as vice-captain. Pelham Warner and Richard Palairet were joint managers.

The team members were:
 Douglas Jardine, Surrey, team captain & batsman
 Bob Wyatt, Warwickshire, vice-captain & batsman
 Gubby Allen, Middlesex, all-rounder
 Les Ames, Kent, wicket-keeper
 Bill Bowes, Yorkshire, fast bowler
 Freddie Brown, Surrey, leg break bowler
 George Duckworth, Lancashire, wicket-keeper
 Wally Hammond, Gloucestershire, all-rounder
 Harold Larwood, Nottinghamshire, opening fast bowler
 Maurice Leyland, Yorkshire, batsman
 Tommy Mitchell, Derbyshire, leg break bowler
 Nawab of Pataudi, Worcestershire, batsman
 Eddie Paynter, Lancashire, batsman
 Herbert Sutcliffe, Yorkshire, opening batsman
 Maurice Tate, Sussex, all-rounder
 Hedley Verity, Yorkshire, left arm spin bowler
 Bill Voce, Nottinghamshire, opening fast bowler

Walter Robins and Kumar Shri Duleepsinhji were invited to tour, but declined to do so, the latter because of ill-health.

Test matches

First Test

An easy victory for England, with Bradman absent for Australia. McCabe provided Australia's only significant resistance with the bat; Larwood claimed ten match wickets. Pataudi's century on Test debut was to be his sole Test century, and he was dropped after the second Test due to his dissent against Bodyline tactics (when he refused to move to a leg-side fielding position, Jardine is said to have commented "I see his highness is a conscientious objector").

Second Test

On his return, Bradman was bowled first ball in the first innings when expecting a bouncer; Fingleton was left to hold Australia's first innings together. Nonetheless, an unbeaten century for Bradman in the second innings, and ten wickets for O'Reilly, granted Australia their only victory of the Test series.

Third Test

The match best known for Bodyline, with Woodfull receiving a blow to the chest (although he stayed at the crease to make an obdurate 73 not out) and Oldfield a fractured skull from Larwood's hostile fast bowling (although Oldfield's injury actually came from a top-edge to a waist-high delivery, rather than a proper bouncer, and Larwood was not bowling to a leg-theory field at the time: Oldfield declared it to have been his own fault for a poor shot.) Larwood took seven wickets in the match, but the principal wicket-taker was Allen, who took four in either innings despite his notable dissent against Bodyline.

Fourth Test

A match best remembered for the heroism of Paynter, who despite spending much of the match in hospital with severe tonsillitis, scored 83 in the first innings, and won the match with a six in the second.

Fifth Test

Fine performances from both sides' middle orders (with some aid from dropped catches) led to approximate parity after the first innings. Hammond (101) and Larwood (98) in particular batted excellently; Larwood, promoted to number four as a night-watchman, scored the then highest innings ever made in that role. Bradman and Woodfull shared a partnership of 115 in Australia's second innings before Verity induced a collapse, and Wyatt and Hammond experienced little difficulty in reaching a target of 164, with Hammond in particularly belligerent form.

Ceylon
The English team had a stopover in Colombo en route to Australia and played a one-day single-innings match there against the Ceylon national team, which at that time did not have Test status.

See also
For details of the tactics involved in Bodyline bowling, see the Bodyline article.

References

Further reading

 Bill Frindall, The Wisden Book of Test Cricket 1877-1978, Wisden, 1979
 Chris Harte, A History of Australian Cricket, Andre Deutsch, 1993
 Ray Robinson, On Top Down Under, Cassell, 1975
 Wisden Cricketers' Almanack, 1934 edition, carries tour and match reports in a section entitled "M.C.C. Team in Australasia" on pages 629 to 673.

1932 in Ceylon
1932 in Australian cricket
1932 in English cricket
1933 in Australian cricket
1933 in English cricket
Australian cricket seasons from 1918–19 to 1944–45
1932-33
1932
International cricket competitions from 1918–19 to 1945
Sri Lankan cricket seasons from 1880–81 to 1971–72
1932-33
Nicknamed sporting events